The fifth season of MasterChef Canada originally aired on April 3, 2018, on CTV and concluded on June 19. Filming began in September 2017 and ended in November 2017. Sherwood Park resident Beccy Stables (originally from Grimsby, England) won the trophy, title, and $100,000 prize money. At the age of 19, Stables became the youngest champion in the history of MasterChef Canada, a title she currently holds, and tied the record for being the youngest contestant to appear and compete on the show. Following her victory, Stables moved to Kelowna, British Columbia, and currently runs a baking website called dessertclub. Stables also guest starred in an episode of the sixth season. This season aired on June 26, 2018, on TLC in India.

Runner-up Andrew "Andy" Hay, who finish second, Marissa Leon-John, who finish seventh and Jennifer "Jen" Jenkins, who finished eighth place, all returned to MasterChef Canada: Back to Win. Jen placed tenth, Marissa placed eighth, and Andy placed the same placement from season 5.

Top 12

Elimination table

 (WINNER) This cook won the competition.
 (RUNNER-UP) This cook finished in second place.
 (WIN) The cook won the individual challenge (Mystery Box Challenge or Elimination Test).
 (WIN) The cook was on the winning team in the Team Challenge and was directly advanced to the next round.
 (HIGH) The cook was one of the top entries in the Mystery Box Challenge, but did not win, or received considerable praise during an Elimination Test.
 (PT) The cook was on the losing team in the Team Challenge or did not win the individual challenge, but won the Pressure Test.
 (IN) The cook was not selected as a top entry or bottom entry in an individual challenge.
 (IN) The cook was not selected as a top entry or bottom entry in a team challenge.
 (IMM) The cook did not have to compete in that round of the competition and was safe from elimination.
 (IMM) The cook was selected by Mystery Box Challenge winner and did not have to compete in the Elimination Test. 
 (PT) The cook was on the losing team in the Team Challenge, competed in the Pressure Test, and advanced.
 (NPT) The cook was on the losing team in the Team Challenge, but was exempted from the Pressure Test
 (RET) The cook was eliminated but returned to the competition.
 (LOW) The cook was one of the bottom entries in an individual elimination challenge or pressure test and advanced.
 (LOW) The cook was one of the bottom entries in the Team Challenge, and advanced.
 (ELIM) The cook was eliminated from MasterChef.

Episodes

References

MasterChef Canada
2018 Canadian television seasons